Anna Gordon may refer to:
Anna Adams Gordon (1853–1931), American social reformer
Anna Gordon Keown (1899–1957), English author
Anna Gordon (ballad collector) (1747–1810), Scottish ballad collector
S. Anna Gordon (1832–?), physician and author

See also
Anne Gordon (born 1941), cricketer
Annabella Gordon (disambiguation)